The Grahovo Tribe (Serbian: Грахово Племе/Grahovo Pleme) or Grahovljani (Serbian Cyrillic: Граховљани) is a historical region and tribe of Old Herzegovina in Montenegro. The Tribe was formed on Brotherhoods and other extinct tribes of Montenegro being  one of the sixteen tribes of Herzegovina, along with the Riđani, Piva, Drobnjaci, Krivošije, Nikšići, Banjani, Mataruge, and others.

Etymology 
The name Grahovljani is an denonym for the place name Grahovo which is composed of Serbo-Croatian grah (bean)(from Proto-Slavic *gorxъ) and -ovo (from Proto-Slavic *-ovъ), a suffix used in Slavic languages to indicate a placename, thereby making the name of Grahovo, 'place of beans'.

Geography 
The tribe of Grahovo is located in correlation with the Region of Grahovo. Its region is determined by the following settlements, which were a part of the Municipality of Grahovo that was abolished in 1960. The settlements are Balosave, Bare, Broćanac, Vilusi, Grahovac, Grahovo, Gornje Polje, Dolovi, Zagora, Zaslap, Jabuke, Nudo, Podbužer, Riječani and Spila. As a tribe, they are mainly centered around the two localities of Vilusi, and Grahovo field.

History

Origin 
The Grahovo tribe was formed around the end of the 17th century and beginning of the 18th century. The tribe was formed by the Nikšići, Drobnjaci, Banjani, Riđani and Kuči during the Grahovo campaign in 1695. Like many other tribes, the Grahovljani weren't formed by a paternal ancestor, rather a group of merging tribes and brotherhoods. According to Petar II Petrović-Njegoš, his great-grandfather and the captain of the Nikšići settled the Grahovo tribe.

History 
When the Venetians captured Grahovo, they wished to create a new tribe of Banjani and the Ridjani. The Banjani were far more organized than the Ridjani. In Jovan Ivović's research, he found many Kotor and Herceg Novi documents which showed a vast amount of Voivodes, Harambaša's, and Princes without names from the territory of Grahovo. After the Venetians pulled out from Grahovo in 1700, the area remained largely uninhabited. Its territory was controlled by Klobuk captains. After 30 years, the Kovačevići and Vujačići settled the area again as kmets (serfs) of Korjenić Muslims. After skirmishes and conflicts of the 19th century Grahovo officially became a tribe.

Brotherhoods 
There were once 69 brotherhoods in the Grahovo tribe with 4,000 people Brotherhoods of the Grahovo tribe include:

 Vujačići
 Bulajići
 Delibašići
 Dragojevci
 Kovačevići
 Milovići
 Vučetići
 Dakovići
 Vujovići
 Andrijaševići
 Vujičići
 Bakoči
 Vučurevići
 Kešeljevići

Vujačići 
The Vujačići are the oldest brotherhood of the Grahovo tribe. Their etymology derives from a female ancestor named Vujača since her husband was killed in Kuci by the Ottomans therefore raising her kids alone and they adopted her name as a matronym. Their Progenitor was Dragoje he had three sons which split apart (Soroje, Boroje, Luka and Majo) and formed the brotherhoods (Vujačići, Bulajići and Vučetići). They descended from the Kuči and Riđani which wiped out the Mataruge tribe in the Medieval Period.

Kovačevići 

The Kovačevići are the largest brotherhood in Grahovo. The Progenitor of the Kovačevići brotherhood is Jovan Kovačević, They came from Jajce, Bosnia in the 1500-1600s and settled in Zaslap, and the Grahovo field. In 1709, a group of the brotherhood moved to Nevesinje.

Velja Gorana

Kovačevići 
The modern family of Kovačevići actually embraces two nonrelated kins. According to our informants, one of them descends from a person called Danila Kovačević from the area of Grahovo, a settlement in the Nikšić municipality in the west of Montenegro, which belonged to the Ottoman Empire for several centuries and became Montenegrin after the 1858 battle of Grahovac. The ancestor of Kovačevići is said to have escaped from a blood feud to the area of Mrkovići. After having found himself in the Muslim community, he converted to Islam, and all his descendants since then have been Muslim. The Kovačević family had mixed with the Albanian Catholic Vučići.

Dakovići 
The Dakovići were originally a part of the Vujačići Brotherhood, Prince Dako is the Progenitor and ancestor of Pero, Jakov and Anto Daković, However, in the 1700s the Grahovo Prince Dako Vujačić was killed due to his collaboration with the Ottomans. The Dakovići formed by taking the patronymic name of Dako Vujačić.

Bulajići 
The Bulajići descend from the Progenitor of the brotherhood, named Dragoje. His origins are from the Kuči tribe, Dragoje killed a Turk and after the Ottomans captured Medun, Kuči in 1457 he fled to Čevo which had not been conquered yet. Dragoje married a person from Čevo along with his family. He had to flee Čevo as well and went to Grahovo Field since it had a better economy. Dragoje died early fighting the Turks, leaving his wife to raise his kids. Dragoje's wife was named Bula leaving their kids to be named Bulina Djeca (Bula's Kids) or Bulići with the successor Bulajići as a matronym.

Vučetići 
The Vučetići have the same origin as the Vujačići and Bulajići, Hailing from the Kuči tribe with their Progenitor being Dragoje, Luka settled in the area of Nudo near Grahovo and Zaslap, Later on in Vilusi as well.

See also 
 Grahovo Region
 Anto Daković
 Drago Obrenov Kovačević

References

Notes

Bibliography

Clarifications 

Historical regions in Montenegro
Tribes of Montenegro